The Texas Tech Red Raiders basketball program competes in the National Collegiate Athletic Association's (NCAA) Division I, representing Texas Tech University in the Big 12 Conference. The program has had 17 head coaches since it began play during the 1925–26 NCAA men's basketball season.

Texas Tech (then known as Texas Technological College) basketball team was formerly named the "Matadors" from 1925 to 1936, to reflect the influence of the Spanish Renaissance architecture on campus. The Matadors' first head coach, Grady Higginbotham, started and led the program until Victor Payne replaced him after two seasons. In 1932, Texas Tech was admitted to the Border Intercollegiate Athletic Association, also known as the Border Conference. In the team's first season of conference play, Texas Tech's fourth head coach, Dell Morgan, went undefeated, winning the first of three consecutive Border Conference championships. At the beginning of the 1937–38 season, Texas Tech's short-lived Matadors moniker was replaced officially with "Red Raiders", the nickname the team has today. Texas Tech received their first postseason bid in 1942 to the National Association of Intercollegiate Basketball (NAIA) tournament during Berl Huffman's final season with the team in his first term as head coach. Huffman's successor, Polk Robison, led Texas Tech to their first NCAA tournament appearance in  1956, the same year Robison began a three-year conference championship winning streak. Before withdrawing from the Border Conference in 1956, the Red Raiders won five conference championships and one co-championship.

In 1957, Texas Tech was admitted to the Southwest Conference (SWC), in which it experienced similar success as it had in the Border Conference. In the regular season, the Red Raiders won four conference championships and three conference co-championships. At the end of the 1976 regular season, the SWC began an annual conference tournament known as the SWC Classic. Texas Tech won five SWC Classic titles in their six appearances in the conference tournament championship game; three under Gerald Myers and two under James Dickey. The university remained in the SWC until the conference ceased operations in 1996, when Dickey's 1995–96 team ended the season ranked eighth in both the Associated Press Poll and Coaches' Poll and won the conference's final regular season and SWC Classic titles. Following the dissolution of the SWC, the university became a charter member in the South Division of the Big 12 Conference. Since joining the Big 12 Conference, the Red Raiders did not receive a bid to postseason play until 2002, when Hall of Fame coach Bob Knight was hired. During Knight's six-year tenure, Texas Tech received five postseason bids, participating in four NCAA tournaments and one National Invitation Tournament (NIT). The Red Raiders won the third place playoff in the 2003 NIT tournament, the farthest a Red Raiders men's basketball team has advanced in postseason play. During the 2007–08 season, Bob Knight resigned as head coach and his son, then assistant head coach, Pat Knight became Texas Tech's 13th head coach. In the 2009-10 season, Pat Knight led the Red Raiders to the (NIT) where they were defeated in the quarterfinals. After failing to make the NCAA tournament, and compiling a 16-42 Big 12 Conference record over his three and a half seasons as head coach, Texas Tech terminated Pat Knight's position has head coach. On March 20, 2011, Texas Tech hired Billy Clyde Gillispie, former head coach of the Kentucky Wildcats, Texas A&M Aggies, and UTEP Miners, as the 14th head coach of the Texas Tech men's basketball program.

Key

Coaches 
Statistics correct as of the end of the 2015–16 NCAA Division I men's basketball season

Notes

References
General

Specific

Texas Tech

Red Raiders basketball, coaches
Texas Tech Red Raiders basketball, coaches